Saint Cadfan, sometimes Anglicized as Gideon, was the 6th century founder-abbot of Tywyn (whose church is dedicated to him) and Bardsey, both in Gwynedd, Wales. He was said to have received the island of Bardsey from Saint Einion Frenin, king of Llŷn, around 516 and to have served as its abbot until 542.

Life and legacy 
Most of the information we have about Cadfan is from the awdl by Llywelyn the Bard in the 12th century. According to this he sailed from Brittany to Tywyn with 12 other saints, although some suggest that they came instead from Llanilltud Fawr.

A Breton nobleman, he was said to be the son of Eneas Ledewig (Aeneas of Brittany) and Gwen Teirbron (Gwen Three Breasts), daughter of Budic II of Brittany. He journeyed to Britain accompanied by the children of Ithel Hael o Lydaw (of Brittany): Baglan, Flewyn, Gredifael, Tanwg, Twrog, Tegai, Trillo, Tecwyn and Llechid. Other reputed followers include Maël and Ilar. Wade-Evans thought Kentinlau, who accompanied Cadfan to Ceredigion, should be identified with Cynllo. They may have fled the Franks.

At Llangadfan in northern Powys he founded a church before moving on to Bardsey. He also established a clas at Tywyn (traditionally the first such clas in Wales) which became a wealthy site, served by an abbot and clerics from 1147 to 1291, mother church of the cantref of Meirionnydd south of the River Dysynni.

His feast day is 1 November.

References

Sources 
Biography from the Dictionary of Welsh Biography
The Welsh Academy Encyclopaedia of Wales, University of Wales Press, 2008,

External links
 St. Cadfan - Saints & Angels

Medieval Breton saints
Medieval Welsh saints
Companions of Cadfan
Roman Catholic monks
Welsh Roman Catholic saints
Year of birth unknown
Year of death missing